The 2017–18 season was Mansfield Town's 121st season in their history and their fifth consecutive season in League Two.

Results

Friendlies
As of 26 June 2017, Mansfield Town have announced eight pre-season friendlies. On 1 November 2017, it was announced Mansfield Town would face Clipstone.

League Two

The League Two fixtures were released on 21 June 2017.

League table

FA Cup

On 16 October 2017, Mansfield Town were drawn away to Shaw Lane in the first round. A second round home tie against Accrington Stanley or Guiseley was confirmed. Guiseley won that match 4–3 on penalties following a 1–1 scoreline  to face Mansfield.

EFL Cup

On 16 June 2017, Mansfield Town were drawn at home to Rochdale in the first round.

EFL Trophy

On 12 July 2017, Mansfield Town were drawn alongside Everton U23s, Lincoln City and Notts County in Northern Group G. After finishing as runners-up, Mansfield were drawn away to Blackpool in the second round.

Squad statistics

Transfers

Transfers in

Transfers out

Loans in

Loans out

References

Mansfield Town F.C. seasons
Mansfield Town